The 1951 Ottawa Rough Riders finished in 1st place in the Interprovincial Rugby Football Union with a 7–5 record and won the Grey Cup.

Preseason

Regular season

Standings

Schedule

Postseason

Playoffs

Grey Cup

Awards and honours

References

Ottawa Rough Riders seasons
James S. Dixon Trophy championship seasons
Grey Cup championship seasons
1951 Canadian football season by team